The women's 3000 metres at the 1988 Summer Olympics in Seoul, South Korea had an entry list of 35 competitors, with two qualifying heats (35) before the final (15) took place on Sunday September 25, 1988.

Final

Qualifying heats

See also
 1987 Women's World Championships 3.000 metres (Rome)
 1990 Women's European Championships 3.000 metres (Split)
 1991 Women's World Championships 3.000 metres (Tokyo)
 1992 Women's Olympic 3.000 metres (Barcelona)

References

External links
  Official Report

 1
5000 metres at the Olympics
1988 in women's athletics
Women's events at the 1988 Summer Olympics